Thomas Trotter (1779–8 September, 1851; Worthing), was an English theatrical impresario active in English provincial theatre in the early nineteenth century. He was based in Worthing, but opened theatres at a number of other locations.

Theatrical career
Thomas was based in Hythe, Kent when he first acted on the stage in 1794, aged 15.

Trotter was a member of the Prestonian Lodge of Perfect Friendship, a freemasonic lodge founded in 1797 and meeting at the Kings's Arms, Grays, Essex. His membership documentation refers to him as a comedian.

References

1779 births
1851 deaths